Signal is a Bulgarian rock band, most popular in the 1980s and 1990s.

History 
The band was established in 1978 in Sofia by: Yordan Karadzhov(vocal), Georgi Kokalov – drums, Rumen Spasov – guitar and Hristo Lambrev – piano.

Members
Yordan Karadzhov (Йордан Караджов) – vocals, bass guitar
Vladimir Zahariev (Владимир Захариев) – drums
Alexander Marinovsky (Александър Мариновски) – guitar
Georgi Yanakiev (Георги Янакиев) – bass guitar

Discography

External links
 Signal at Bulgarian Rock Archives

Bulgarian rock music groups